Defying Gravity is the ninth studio album by Australian band Sherbet, and second under the name The Sherbs. It was released in 1981. 

French duo Daft Punk sampled "We Ride Tonight" on the song "Contact" from the 2013 album Random Access Memories, which was a number one album in many countries.

Track listing

Personnel 
 Bass – Tony Mitchell
 Drums – Alan Sandow 
 Guitar – Tony Leigh 
 Keyboards – Garth Porter 
 Vocals – Daryl Braithwaite 
Production 
 Artwork [Cover] – Alan Ewart 
 Engineers – David Price, Richard Lush 
 Engineer [Assistant] – Neil Rawle 
 Producer – Richard Lush, The Sherbs 
 Remastered By – William Bowden

Release history

References

Sherbet (band) albums
1981 albums
Atco Records albums
Festival Records albums
Infinity Records albums
Albums produced by Richard Lush